West Virginia's 5th congressional district is an obsolete district existing from 1903 to 1973. While the district's bounds were changed over the years, for most of its existence it was focused on Bluefield and the coal producing southwestern part of the state. For the last 40 years of its existence, it was held by the Kee family.  In the 1970 redistricting, most of the district was combined with the 4th district. As of 2023, the state has two districts, the 1st covering the southern half of the state and the 2nd covering the northern half.

History
The 5th district was formed in 1902.  It was originally formed of Mason, Putnam, Cabell, Lincoln, Wayne, Boone, Lincoln, Mingo, Raleigh, Wyoming, McDowell, and Mercer counties.  It was revised in 1916 to consist of Wayne, Lincoln, Mingo, Logan, McDowell, Wyoming, Mercer, Summers, and Monroe counties.  In 1934, Wayne, Lincoln, and Logan were removed and Greenbrier was added.  It was unchanged for 1952.  In 1962, Greenbrier was removed and Fayette was added.  The district was abolished in the 1972 redistricting.

List of representatives

References

 Congressional Biographical Directory of the United States 1774–present

Former congressional districts of the United States
05
1903 establishments in West Virginia
1973 disestablishments in West Virginia